Peter Brendon Marshall  (born 1953) was the 31st New Zealand Commissioner of Police, serving from 4 April 2011 to 2 April 2014. He was previously Commissioner of the Royal Solomon Islands Police Force.

Marshall is a career police officer who joined the New Zealand Police in 1972, and has worked both in uniform and as a detective with the Criminal Investigation Branch. Within New Zealand, he has served as head of the Hawkes Bay Armed Offenders Squad, and Area Commander in Hastings and Auckland City. Internationally he has been posted to the New Zealand diplomatic missions in Canberra from 1998 to 2002, and Washington, D.C. from 2002 to 2004, where he established a New Zealand Police liaison office for counter-terrorism. He was then Assistant Commissioner at the Police National Headquarters in Wellington, before being seconded to the Solomon Islands in February 2007. In May 2008 he became acting Commissioner of Police in the Solomons, and was officially appointed to the position in March 2009. While in the Solomons he was subjected to a home invasion by a group of thirteen people armed with machetes, but was able to defend himself and his wife with a steel ceremonial sword.

In April 2011, Marshall became the Commissioner of the New Zealand Police, and announced he would put a taser in every frontline vehicle, but would not be changing the policy that officers do not ordinarily carry firearms.

Marshall has diplomas in Business Studies and New Zealand Policing, and is a graduate of the FBI Academy. He was appointed a Member of the New Zealand Order of Merit in the 2000 Queen's Birthday Honours, and promoted to Companion of the New Zealand Order of Merit in the 2014 Queen's Birthday Honours for service to the New Zealand Police and the community.

References

External links
 Biography at the New Zealand Police website
 TV3 interview

1950s births
Living people
Companions of the New Zealand Order of Merit
New Zealand Commissioners of Police
Date of birth missing (living people)
Place of birth missing (living people)
20th-century New Zealand public servants
21st-century New Zealand public servants